Veliki Šušnjar is a village in central Croatia, in the Town of Petrinja, Sisak-Moslavina County.

Demographics
According to the 2011 census, the village of Veliki Šušnjar had 141 inhabitants. This represents 27.71% of its pre-war population according to the 1991 census.

References

Populated places in Sisak-Moslavina County
Serb communities in Croatia